Lisa Cole Zimmerman (born Lisa Denae Cole; August 30, 1969) is an American former soccer player who played as a forward, making two appearances for the United States women's national team.

Career
Cole Zimmerman played for the Bishop Lynch Friars in high school, where was an All-America selection in 1987. She also played basketball and softball for the Friars, and earned all-state honors in all three sports. In 1987, she was the school's Female Athlete of the Year and Female Academic Athlete of the Year. In college, she played for the SMU Mustangs from 1987 to 1990, having earned a scholarship, and finished as the school's all-time leading scorer with 101 goals and 44 assists in 78 appearances. She was a First Team All-America selection in 1990, and a Freshman All-American in 1987. In 1995 she was inducted into the Bishop Lynch High School Sports Honor Roll, and in 2011 she was inducted into the SMU Mustangs Hall of Fame.

Cole Zimmerman made her international debut for the United States on July 27, 1990 in a friendly match against Canada. In total, she made two appearances for the U.S., earning her final cap on August 9, 1990 in a friendly match against England.

She later coached the Dallas Sting '79 girls' youth team, which were the 1995 under-16 national champions.

Personal life
Cole Zimmerman was born in Dallas County, Texas, to Leta Ruth Denning and Charles C. Cole. She graduated with a Bachelor of Arts in physical education from Southern Methodist University. She married Steven Hayes Zimmerman in Dallas on 18 May 1991.

Career statistics

International

References

External links
 Lisa Cole Zimmerman in the Hall of Fame of Southern Methodist University

1969 births
Living people
Sportspeople from Dallas
Soccer players from Dallas
American women's soccer players
United States women's international soccer players
Women's association football forwards
SMU Mustangs women's soccer players
American women's soccer coaches